Mary Georgina Wade Wilson (12 September 1856 – 1939) was a Scottish artist known for her watercolor and pastel paintings.

Wilson grew up on the Bantaskine Estate in Falkirk before training in Edinburgh and Paris. She illustrated gardening books and her work includes also illustrations of gardens and the landscaped grounds of the Bantaskine estate were often a subject of her paintings. The Falkirk Museum has an image of her as a child while the Falkirk Community Trust Museum & Archives Collections holds one of her works.

Further reading
 The Dictionary of Scottish Painters 1600 to the Present (1990) by Paul Harris & Julian Halsby, published by Canongate, 
 The Dictionary of Scottish Art and Architecture (1994) by Peter J.M. McEwan, published by Antique Collectors' Club,

References

1856 births
1939 deaths
19th-century Scottish painters
19th-century Scottish women artists
20th-century Scottish painters
20th-century Scottish women artists
People from Falkirk